Method (methodos) literally means a pursuit of knowledge, investigation, mode of prosecuting such inquiry, or system. In recent centuries it more often means a prescribed process for completing a task. It may refer to:

Scientific method, a series of steps, or collection of methods, taken to acquire knowledge
Method (computer programming), a piece of code associated with a class or object to perform a task
Method (patent), under patent law, a protected series of steps or acts
Methodology, comparison or study and critique of individual methods that are used in a given discipline or field of inquiry
Discourse on the Method, a philosophical and mathematical treatise by René Descartes
Methods (journal), a scientific journal covering research on techniques in the experimental biological and medical sciences

Arts
Method (music), a kind of textbook to help students learning to play a musical instrument
Method (2004 film), a 2004 film directed by Duncan Roy
Method (2017 film), a South Korean film
Method (Godhead), the bassist and programmer for the industrial band Godhead
Method acting, a style of acting in which the actor attempts to replicate the conditions under which the character operates
Method Acting, a song by the group Bright Eyes on their album "Lifted or The Story Is in the Soil, Keep Your Ear to the Ground"
Method ringing, a British style of ringing church bells according to a series of mathematical algorithms
Method Man, an American rapper
"Method", a song by Living Colour from the album The Chair in the Doorway
"A Method", a song by TV on the Radio from the album Return to Cookie Mountain

Business
Method Incorporated, an international brand experience agency
Method Products (branded as "method"), a San Francisco-based corporation that manufactures household products
Method Studios, a Los Angeles-based visual effects company

See also

 
 
 
 Methodology
 The Method (disambiguation)
 Methodism (disambiguation)